Kenneth Lloyd Swenson (born April 18, 1948 in Clay Center, Kansas) is a retired middle-distance runner from the United States. Swenson was the world leader at 800 meters in 1970 and competed in the 1972 Summer Olympics in Munich.

Career
As a senior at Kansas State University, Swenson won the 880 yards in 1:46.3 at the 1970 NCAA outdoor championships. He also won at that year's national (AAU) championships, narrowly defeating Mark Winzenried as both were timed in 1:47.4. Swenson set his personal best for 800 meters, 1:44.8, on July 16, 1970 in Stuttgart in a dual meet between the United States and West Germany; the time was the fastest in the world that year and a new American record for the metric distance. Track & Field News ranked Swenson the world's second-best half-miler that year, behind Yevgeniy Arzhanov of the Soviet Union.

In 1971 Swenson only placed third in the AAU outdoor meet (behind Juris Luzins and Jamaica's Byron Dyce); however, he won gold at the Pan American Games in Cali, running 1:48.08. At the 1972 Olympic Trials Swenson ran 1:45.1, his best time since 1970; he lost to Dave Wottle (who equaled the world record of 1:44.3) and Rick Wohlhuter, but took the third and final Olympic qualifying spot ahead of early leader Jim Ryun. At the Olympics in Munich Swenson qualified from his heat, but was disqualified in the semi-finals.

Swenson continued his career for several more years; in March 1975 he joined the International Track Association (ITA), a professional circuit. Swenson set his personal best for the mile run, 3:59.1, in an ITA meet on May 3, 1975; he was the 75th American to run a four-minute mile.

Notes

References

1948 births
Living people
People from Clay Center, Kansas
Track and field athletes from Kansas
American male middle-distance runners
Olympic track and field athletes of the United States
Athletes (track and field) at the 1972 Summer Olympics
Pan American Games gold medalists for the United States
Pan American Games medalists in athletics (track and field)
Athletes (track and field) at the 1971 Pan American Games
Kansas State Wildcats men's track and field athletes
Medalists at the 1971 Pan American Games